Augustine Henry Shepperd (February 24, 1792 – July 11, 1864) was a lawyer and politician in North Carolina; he served as a Congressional Representative from North Carolina for numerous terms, most often as a member of the Whig Party.

Early life and education
Born in Rockford, North Carolina, on February 24, 1792, Shepperd completed private preparatory studies and studied law. He had a younger brother William W. Shepperd, who emigrated to Mexican Texas with others in the family and bought land there in 1835. Augustine Shepperd was admitted to the bar and commenced practice in Surry County, North Carolina.

Political career
Shepperd soon became involved in politics, being elected to the State house of representatives and serving 1822–1826.

He was elected to the Twentieth through Twenty-third Congresses. He was elected as a Whig to the Twenty-fourth and Twenty-fifth Congresses (serving March 4, 1827 – March 3, 1839). 

During these periods, he served as chairman, Committee on Expenditures in the Department of the Navy (Twenty-first Congress), Committee on Expenditures in the Department of War (Twenty-second Congress), and on the Committee on Expenditures in the Department of State (Twenty-third and Twenty-fourth Congresses).

He was an unsuccessful candidate for reelection in 1838 to the Twenty-sixth Congress.  In the next cycle, he was elected again as a Whig to the Twenty-seventh Congress (March 4, 1841 – March 3, 1843); serving as chairman, Committee on Public Expenditures (Twenty-seventh Congress).

After another gap, he was elected as a Whig to the Thirtieth and Thirty-first Congresses (March 4, 1847 – March 3, 1851). He declined to run for reelection in 1850 and returned to North Carolina to resume the practice of law. He died at the plantation "Good Spring," Salem, North Carolina, on July 11, 1864. He was interred in Salem Cemetery.

Shepperd married and had a family. He was the father of Mary Frances ("Fanny") Shepperd. She married William Dorsey Pender, who became a Confederate general.

See also

Twentieth United States Congress
Twenty-first United States Congress
Twenty-second United States Congress
Twenty-third United States Congress
Twenty-fourth United States Congress
Twenty-fifth United States Congress
Twenty-seventh United States Congress
Thirtieth United States Congress
Thirty-first United States Congress

External links 
U.S. Congress Biographical Directory entry
 

1792 births
People from Rockford, North Carolina
North Carolina lawyers
Shepperd, Augustine Henry
1864 deaths
Burials at Salem Cemetery
North Carolina Whigs
Jacksonian members of the United States House of Representatives from North Carolina
19th-century American politicians
National Republican Party members of the United States House of Representatives from North Carolina
Whig Party members of the United States House of Representatives